Campylomorphus homalisinus is a species of beetles belonging to the family Elateridae, and the sole member of the genus Campylomorphus.

Distribution and habitat
This species is present in France, Italy, Portugal, and Spain. This rare orophilous species occurs in shrublands, grasslands and in the forests. Adults usually forage on flowers. Larvae live in rotten wood and forest litter.

Description

References 

Elateridae
Beetles described in 1807